London Tradition Ltd is a clothing designer and manufacturer,  specialising in traditional British duffle coats, pea coats and trench coats. The company was founded in January 2001 by Mamun Chowdhury and Rob Huson, is based in London, England, and has around 100 employees.

History

In January 2001, Mamun Chowdhury and Rob Huson set up London Tradition. The company operates from a factory and design studio in Hackney Wick in the East End of London near the Olympic park, designing and manufacturing luxury duffle coats for export.

The company designs clothing that is manufactured in the UK.

Export
The company now exports 30,000 to 35,000 coats a year, 90% of its output is outside of the UK, it exports to 12 markets, including the Asia Pacific region, Europe, Japan, Germany, Italy, France, Austria, Netherlands and Spain. It has seen overseas sales rise by 865% between 2007 and 2013.

Awards and recognition
London Tradition was twice awarded a Queen's Awards for Enterprise for International Trade in recognition of its business performance: once in July 2014 and again in April 2020. The citation of the 2014 award noted he company's success in having "taken British outerwear - including the humble duffle coat - and transformed them into a luxury heritage brand for an international market."

See also

Business of British Bangladeshis

References

External links

Plus Size Clothing

Clothing companies established in 2001
2001 establishments in England
Clothing manufacturers
Manufacturing companies based in London
Privately held companies based in London